The Butuan City Hall complex is the seat of local government of the city of Butuan.

History
The city hall began construction in the mid-1990s and completed in 2003 under Mayor Democrito Plaza II. It was inaugurated on August 2, 2005, by Mayor Daisy Plaza. Shortly after city officials were transferred to the new building, the old building was razed. In 2009, Mayor Plaza II began construction of a new three-story councilor's building, but construction was halted due to lack of funds. The councilor's building was finally completed in 2013 as a two-story building, and the rescue office was also opened. In 2014, a command center was added to the city hall.

Facilities

City hall
City engineering office
Mayor's office
Vice-Mayor's office
City atrium
Transparency Corner
City Disaster risk Reduction Management office
Philippine Charity Sweepstakes office – Butuan branch
City Public Information Office

Councilor's building
Interior and Local Government office – Butuan branch
Function hall
City Councilor's Office

Outside city hall

Rajah Kolambu Monument (unfinished)
Commission on Audit - Butuan office
City Security office
City Hall Park
Radyo Pilipinas - Butuan Station

See also
Butuan
List of Butuan city officials

References

External links
 Butuan City Government Website
 Butuan City Facebook Page

Buildings and structures in Butuan
City and municipal halls in the Philippines